Harry Stephen Keeler (November 3, 1890 – January 22, 1967) was a prolific but little-known American fiction writer, who developed a cult following for his eccentric mysteries. He also wrote science fiction.

Biography 

Born in Chicago in 1890, Keeler spent his childhood exclusively in this city, which was so beloved by the author that a large number of his works took place in and around it. In many of his novels, Keeler refers to Chicago as "the London of the west". The expression is explained in the opening of Thieves' Nights (1929):

Here ... were seemingly the same hawkers ... selling the same goods ... here too was the confusion, the babble of tongues of many lands, the restless, shoving throng containing faces and features of a thousand racial castes, and last but not least, here on Halsted and Maxwell streets, Chicago, were the same dirt, flying bits of torn paper, and confusion that graced the junction of Middlesex and Whitechapel High streets far across the globe.

Other locales for Keeler novels include New Orleans and New York. In his later works, Keeler's settings are often more generic settings such as Big River, or a city in which all buildings and streets are either nameless or fictional. Keeler is known to have visited London at least once.

Early adulthood 
Keeler's mother was a widow several times over who operated a boarding house popular with theatrical performers. Beginning around age sixteen, Keeler wrote a steady stream of original short stories and serials that were subsequently published in many small pulp magazines of the day.

Circa 1910, when Keeler was about twenty, his mother committed him to an insane asylum for reasons unknown. This initialed Keeler's interest in madness, asylums and the predicament of sane people who had been consigned to such institutions. It also gave him a lifelong violent antipathy towards the psychiatric profession.

Keeler attended the Armour Institute (now the Illinois Institute of Technology) and graduated with a degree in electrical engineering. It was at this time that Keeler met his future wife, Hazel Goodwin, whom he would marry in 1919. After graduation, he took a job as an electrician in a steel mill, working by day and writing by night. A notable early work was the 1915 science fiction story "John Jones' Dollar", originally published in a magazine entitled The Black Cat. A reprint would appear in an early (1927) issue of Amazing Stories, the first American science fiction pulp. In the story, a single invested dollar has by the 33rd century grown to a fortune as a result of compound interest.

With E.P. Dutton 
Eight of Keeler's earliest works first appeared in pulp fiction magazines like Complete Novel and Top Notch.

His first four novels were originally released in England by Hutchinson, beginning in 1924 with The Voice of the Seven Sparrows. Beginning in 1927, E. P. Dutton took over publication of Keeler's novels in the US. Between 1927 and 1942, Dutton released 37 novels by Keeler. In the United Kingdom, publication of Keeler's novels, sometimes with altered titles and reworked prose, fell to Ward, Lock & Co., who went on to publish 48 novels by Keeler from 1929 to 1953. The Voice of the Seven Sparrows introduced audiences the world over to Keeler's complicated "webwork plot" story lines with wildly improbable in-story coincidences and sometimes sheerly baffling conclusions. Keeler's complex, labyrinthine stories generally alienated his intended reading audience.

Owing to his  popularity with Dutton, however, Keeler gained notoriety in the mid-1930s as a purveyor of new and original stories. His popularity peaked when his book Sing Sing Nights was used to "suggest" two different low-budget mystery-adventure films, namely Sing Sing Nights (Monogram Pictures, 1933) and The Mysterious Mr. Wong (Monogram, 1935), the latter of which starred screen legend Bela Lugosi. During this period Keeler was employed as an editor for Ten Story Book, a popular pulp short-story magazine that also included photos of nude and scantily clad young women. Keeler proceeded to fill the spaces between the features with his own peculiar brand of humor and included illustrations drawn by his wife. Here, he also often publicized his own books.

Keeler's relations with the Duttons grew erratic and strained. Keeler's 1941 novel The Peacock Fan appears to take a dig at the Duttons through a pair of faintly disguised characters. In his later career, Keeler's fiction and writing style grew more bizarre and his books longer. He often substituted plot with lengthy dialogue and diatribes between characters. His readership flagged.  In 1942, after releasing The Book with the Orange Leaves, Keeler was dropped by Dutton. Ward, Lock & Co. continued to issue his books in the United Kingdom until 1953.

Later years 
The years from 1942 to 1953 were difficult for Keeler. His writing drifted even further beyond the norm and short stories written by his wife (a moderately successful writer herself) were found more and more within his novels. Keeler typically padded the length of his novels with the following device: his protagonist would find a magazine or book, open it at random and discover a story. At this point, Keeler's novel would insert the complete verbatim text of one of his wife's short stories, this being the story his novel's protagonist was reading. At the end of the story, the novel would continue where it left off, several pages nearer to its contractual minimum word count. These stories-within-the-novel typically contained only a few scraps of information that were relevant to the novel in which they appeared.

Keeler's novels were picked up by rental library publisher Phoenix Press, known in the business as the "last stop on the publishing bus". By 1953, British publishers Ward, Lock & Co. printed their final Keeler novel, thus forcing the writer to pen his stories exclusively for an overseas market with stories often translated for publication in Spain and Portugal.

Hazel died in 1960. Keeler remarried in 1963 to his onetime secretary Thelma Rinaldo, which rejuvenated his spirit for writing. Unfortunately, many of the new stories written by Keeler during this time went unpublished, including the relatively infamous The Scarlet Mummy. Keeler died in Chicago four years later, in 1967. He and his wife Hazel are buried in Rosehill Cemetery.

After death 
In 2005, The Collins Library (an imprint of McSweeney's) republished Keeler's 1934 classic, The Riddle of the Traveling Skull, a project much pursued by writer and publisher Paul Collins. Ramble House has published other works by him.

Writing techniques and preoccupations 

Most of Keeler's novels feature what Keeler called a "webwork plot" ("ludicrous but internally consistent coincidence"). This can be defined as a plot that includes many strands or threads (each thread representing a character or significant object), which intersect in complex causal interactions. A webwork novel typically ends with a surprise revelation which clarifies these interactions. According to Keeler's 1927 series of articles on plot theory, "The Mechanics (and Kinematics) of Web-Work Plot Construction", a webwork plot is typically built around a sequence in which the main character intersects at least four other strands, one after the other, and each of these encounters causes the next one. Keeler never claimed to have invented the webwork plot, but only to be its theorist and practitioner.

Keeler followed a writing procedure of his own; he'd often write a huge manuscript, perhaps twice the length required. He'd then cut it down to size, removing unnecessary subplots and incidents. The removed material (which he called "the Chunk") would sit around until Keeler wrote another manuscript to use it, which might result in yet cutting procedure, and another "Chunk". In his book Thieves' Nights, the hero reads a book which is about two other men telling stories: a framing device within a framing device. In another book, Keeler and his wife turn up as characters in a story.

Keeler kept a large file of newspaper clippings featuring unusual stories and incidents. He is reputed to have pasted these into the rough outlines of his novels, adding notes like "Have this happen to... "

Keeler is known for the MacGuffin-esque insertion of skulls into nearly all his stories. While many plots revolved around a skull or the use of one in a crime or ritual, others featured skulls as a diversion. As an example, a human skull was used as a paperweight on the desk of a police detective.

Several of Keeler's novels make reference to a fictional book entitled The Way Out, which is apparently a tome of ancient Oriental wisdom. The significance of the nonexistent Way Out in Keeler's world is equivalent to the role played by the Necronomicon within H. P. Lovecraft's work.

Influence and parallels 
In the late 1930s, British writer John Russell Fearn gave credit to Keeler for inspiring his experiments with webwork plots in his pulp SF stories.

Keeler has influenced later writers, including Neil Gaiman and Futurama producer Ken Keeler (no relation); Ken Keeler says in the DVD commentary for "Time Keeps on Slippin'" that the story "Strange Romance" from the book Y. Cheung, Business Detective was an inspiration for the episode.

Writer Jack Woodford wrote the article Tale Incredible: The True Story of Harry Stephen Keeler's Literary Rise about Keeler.

Keeler's webwork technique anticipates the so-called hysterical realism of later novelists such as Thomas Pynchon. Gabriele Rico in Writing the Natural Way advises aspiring writers to practice a form of webwork, which she calls "clustering", to encourage associational thinking which can be used to create characters and plot lines.

Films that exhibit probably unwitting similarities to Keeler's work include Murder Story (1989), in which Christopher Lee plays a Keeler-like character who keeps a large collection of newspaper clippings as part of his "Willard Hope Technique" for writing novels, which closely resembles Keeler's "webwork novel" technique. R. Kelly's series of music videos Trapped in the Closet shows a number of parallels to Keeler's style.

In 2010, Bavo Dhooge (nl) published De Sciencefictionschrijver, a novel about one man's obsession with Keeler, under the pseudonym Harold S. Karstens.

The independent studio, United Film House, announced plans to release "The Flyer Hold-Up" in 2015, a film based on Keeler's story "The Flyer Hold Up; or, The Mystery of Train Thirty-Eight", published in the Chicago Ledger in four parts from December 4–25, 1915.

Icelandic novelist Sjón has acknowledged Keeler as an inspiration, as has Spanish writer Raúl Herrero in his novel Rascayú.

Works

Series 
Tuddleton Trotter Series
 The Matilda Hunter Murder (1931) (UK title The Black Satchel)
 The Case of the Barking Clock (1947)
 The Trap (1956)

Marceau Series
 The Marceau Case (1936)
 X. Jones—Of Scotland Yard (1936)
 The Wonderful Scheme of Mr. Christopher Thorne (1936)
 Y. Cheung, Business Detective (1939)

The Mysterious Mr. I
 The Mysterious Mr. I (1937)
 The Chameleon (1939)

Vagabond Nights
 The Skull of the Waltzing Clown (1935)
 The Defrauded Yeggman (1937)
 Ten Hours (1937)
 When Thief Meets Thief (1938)

Hallowe'en Nights
 Finger! Finger! (1938)
 Behind That Mask (1938)

Adventures of a Skull
 The Man with the Magic Eardrums (1939)
 The Man with the Crimson Box (1940)
 The Man with the Wooden Spectacles (1941)
 The Case of the Lavender Gripsack (1941)

The Big River Trilogy
 The Portrait of Jirjohn Cobb (1939) (UK title: 'Find Actor Hart)
 Cleopatra's Tears (1940)
 The Bottle with the Green Wax Seal (1942)

Circus Series
 The Vanishing Gold Truck (1941)
 The Case of the Jeweled Ragpicker (1948) (UK title The Ace of Spades Murder)
 Stand By—London Calling! (1953)
 The Case of the Crazy Corpse
 The Circus Stealers
 A Copy of Beowulf
 Report on Vanessa Hewstone
 The Six from Nowhere
 The Case of the Two-Headed Idiot

The Way Out Series
 The Peacock Fan
 The Sharkskin Book
 The Book with the Orange Leaves
 The Case of the Two Strange Ladies
 The Case of the 16 Beans

Steeltown Series
 The Case of the Canny Killer
 The Steeltown Strangler
 The Crimson Cube

Quiribus Brown Series
 The Murdered Mathematician
 The Case of the Flying Hands

Hong Lei Chung Series
 The Strange Will
 The Street of a Thousand Eyes
 The Six from Nowhere
 The Riddle of the Wooden Parakeet

Non-series novels and short fiction 
 Adventure in Milwaukee
 The Affair of the Bottled Deuce
 The Amazing Web (1930)
 The Blackmailer
 The Box from Japan (1932)
 The Case of the Ivory Arrow
 The Case of the Mysterious Moll (1944) (UK title: The Iron Ring)
 The Case of the Transparent Nude
 The Case of the Transposed Legs
 The Face of the Man from Saturn (1933) (UK Title The Crilly Court Mystery)
 Find the Clock (1925)
 The Five Silver Buddhas (1935)
 The Flyer Hold-Up
 The Fourth King (1929)
 The Gallows Waits, My Lord
 The Green Jade Hand (1930)
 Hangman's Nights
 I Killed Lincoln at 10:13!
 The Iron Ring
 "John Jones's Dollar" (1927)
 The Man Who Changed His Skin
 The Monocled Monster
 The Murder of London Lew
 The Mysterious Card
 The Mysterious Ivory Ball of Wong Shing Li
 The Mystery of the Fiddling Cracksman (1934) (UK title The Fiddling Cracksman)
 The Photo of Lady X
 The Riddle of the Traveling Skull (1934) (UK title The Traveling Skull)
 The Scarlet Mummy (1965)
 The Search for X-Y-Z
 Sing Sing Nights (1928)
 The Spectacles of Mr. Cagliostro (1926) (also published as The Blue Spectacles)
 Strange Journey
 The Straw Hat Murders
 The Stolen Gravestone
 Thieves' Nights (1929)
 The Riddle of the Yellow Zuri (1930) (UK title: The Tiger Snake)
 The Voice of the Seven Sparrows (1924)
 The Washington Square Enigma (1933) (UK title: Under Twelve Stars)
 The White Circle

Further reading

See also 
 Metafiction
 Story within a story

References

External links 
 William Poundstone. Harry Stephen Keeler
 The Harry Stephen Keeler Society
 
 
 
 Ramble House – Publisher of Keeler reprints.
 Harry Stephen Keeler papers at the Rare Book and Manuscript Library, Columbia UniversityPDF
 Mark Allen. My Trip to Columbia University To Discover the Unknown Works of Harry Stephen Keeler

1890 births
1967 deaths
20th-century American novelists
Burials at Rosehill Cemetery
Illinois Institute of Technology alumni
Writers from Chicago
American mystery writers
American male novelists
American male short story writers
Pulp fiction writers
20th-century American short story writers
20th-century American male writers
Novelists from Illinois